The Namazgjahu Mosque, also called Big Mosque is one of the six mosques in Ulcinj, the biggest one.

History
It was built by Suleiman Mujali from Ulcinj in 1728. The Friday Khutbah is given in Arabic and Albanian language. The facade of the mosque is being restored since 2011.

See also 
 Ulcinj
 List of mosques in Ulcinj

References

Mosques in Ulcinj
Ottoman architecture in Montenegro